Annihilation is a 2014 novel by Jeff VanderMeer. It is the first in a series of three books called the Southern Reach Trilogy. The book describes a team of four women (a biologist, an anthropologist, a psychologist, and a surveyor) who set out into an area known as Area X. The area is abandoned and cut off from the rest of civilization. They are the 12th expedition; the previous expeditions have been fraught with disappearances, suicides, aggressive cancers, and mental trauma. The novel won the 2014 Nebula Award for Best Novel and the 2014 Shirley Jackson Award for best novel.

A film based on the novel, starring Natalie Portman, was released by Paramount Pictures on February 23, 2018.

Background 
The inspiration for Annihilation and the Southern Reach Trilogy was a  hike through St. Marks National Wildlife Refuge in northwestern Florida. Many of the animals and vegetation that VanderMeer has seen on this hike over the past 17 years appear in the novel. He has said that someday he hopes to do a "Weird Nature" anthology as well.

In March 2014, as part of a piece on VanderMeer and Annihilation, VanderMeer visited the St. Marks Lighthouse that inspired one of the settings in Annihilation.

Plot summary

A team of four women (a fifth having abandoned the team before entering) crosses the border into an uninhabited area known as "Area X," an unspecified coastal location that has been closed to the public for three decades. The group comprises the 12th expedition into Area X and consists of a biologist, an anthropologist, a psychologist, and a surveyor, none of whom are ever identified by name. The story is told through the biologist's field journal, written near the end of the expedition. It is revealed that the biologist's husband was part of the preceding 11th expedition, from which he had returned unexpectedly, showing up in their kitchen without any recollection of how he got there. The other members of the 11th expedition had shown up similarly, and a few months later, her husband and all the others had died of cancer.

After the first night spent at the base camp, the 12th expedition comes upon a structure containing a set of spiral stairs descending into the ground. Inside the structure (which the biologist repeatedly calls a tower), along the staircase, they find cursive writing that begins with the words "Where lies the strangling fruit..." The words appear to be written with a plant material growing several inches from the exterior wall. While the biologist examines the writing, she accidentally inhales spores from this material. After returning from the tower, the biologist discovers that the psychologist, who is the appointed leader, has programmed the group with specific triggers via hypnosis. By saying the phrase "consolidation of authority," the psychologist hypnotizes all except the biologist, who believes that the spores she has inhaled have made her resistant. The group decides to return to base camp, and at dusk, they hear a moaning noise from far away.

After a night at base camp, the anthropologist is missing; the psychologist claims she decided to leave and return to the border. The group then makes their way back to the "tower," where the psychologist stands watch while the surveyor and the biologist descend the stairs. The biologist sees that the tower is made of living tissue, which the surveyor cannot perceive due to lingering hypnotic suggestion. Eventually, they come upon the body of the anthropologist, whom they believe came into fatal contact with the writer of the text on the wall (which the biologist names "the Crawler"). Returning to the top, they find the psychologist missing and, after a fruitless search, decide to return to base camp. That night the biologist sees a light from the area of a distant lighthouse. The next day, the biologist is conscious of a "brightness" growing within herself, which she attributes to the spores. She leaves for the lighthouse while the surveyor stays behind.

At the lighthouse, the biologist finds a large pile of journals from past expeditions, indicating that there have been many more expeditions than they had been told about. One of the journals belongs to her late husband. She also finds a photograph of someone she thinks is the lighthouse keeper from 30 years previously, when Area X had been abandoned. Near the base of the lighthouse, she finds the psychologist seriously injured after jumping from the top. Perceiving the biologist as glowing and frightened by her approach, the psychologist repeatedly screams the word "annihilation" in an attempt to induce suicide in the biologist through hypnotic suggestion. Before dying, the psychologist tells the biologist that the border is expanding slowly northward toward the Southern Reach's facility.

As the biologist returns to base camp, she has a close encounter with the moaning creature that the team has heard every night in the reeds. She is able to escape but is ambushed by the surveyor, who is also terrified of her glow. They exchange gunfire. With newly-enhanced perception and reflexes, the biologist manages to outflank and kill the surveyor but is wounded. She learns that being injured impedes the process of her "brightening," which continues to take over her body as she recovers.

Now the only surviving member of the 12th expedition, the biologist takes time to analyze plant and animal samples she has gathered and discovers that some have human cells. She also reads her husband's journal and finds that his all-male team of eight was designated "11G," suggesting multiple "11th expeditions." Her husband's team had found the "tower" on their fifth day but did not explore it, moving to the lighthouse first. After discovering the massive pile of journals, the team of explorers split up, with two members choosing to explore the tower, four deciding to remain in the lighthouse, and the biologist's husband and his team's surveyor choosing to explore the land beyond. Finding that Area X seemed to stretch out indefinitely, they returned to the lighthouse, only to find that their team's psychologist had been murdered by a beast and then somehow resurrected and that the rest of the men had turned on one another. At the tower, they were unable to find the other two men but later saw doppelgängers of the team's members — including themselves and all except the psychologist — entering the tower. At this point, the two decided to abandon their mission and leave Area X, the surveyor attempting to return via the way the team had entered, and the biologist's husband trying to cross the border via boat, following the shore.

After reading her husband's journal, the biologist returns to the tower. She makes her way down the spiral staircase and eventually finds the Crawler. After a nearly fatal encounter, she continues down the stairs until she sees a door. Unable to continue, she returns toward the top, perceiving within the Crawler the face of the lighthouse keeper from the photograph. The biologist decides to remain in Area X and seek some trace of her late husband.

Reception

The reviews for Annihilation have been generally positive. Jason Sheehan of National Public Radio described the book as page-turning and suspenseful, saying, "about three hours later, I looked up again with half the book behind me and wondered how I'd gotten from there to here." Salon.com named it book of the week while GQ Magazine recognized it as one of the top books for the month of February and said that it was "about an intelligent, deadly fungus [which] makes for an enthralling read." The Washington Post said that it was "successfully creepy, an old-style gothic horror novel set in a not-too-distant future" while The Daily Telegraph said that it "shows signs of being the novel that will allow VanderMeer to break through to a new and larger audience." Entertainment Weekly gave Annihilation a B+ rating.

The novel won the 2014 Nebula Award for Best Novel and the 2014 Shirley Jackson Award for best novel.

Film adaptation

In 2014, Paramount Pictures acquired rights to the novel, with writer-director Alex Garland set to adapt the script and direct the film. In May 2015, Natalie Portman entered into talks to star in the film. In November 2015, Jane the Virgin star Gina Rodriguez was in talks to co-star in the film with Portman. In March 2016, it was announced that Oscar Isaac would join the cast of the film.

Garland stated to Creative Screenwriting that his adaptation is based on only the first novel of the trilogy, saying, "At the point I started working on Annihilation, there was only one of the three books. I knew that it was planned as a trilogy by the author, but there was only the manuscript for the first book." Location filming by Lighthouse Pictures Ltd occurred, starting in late April 2016 in South Forest, Windsor Great Park. Lighthouse Pictures has a charge arrangement registered with UK Companies House regarding the matter. Production was confirmed to begin as David Gyasi was added to the cast. The teaser trailer for the film premiered in September 2017, and the film was released on February 23, 2018, to very positive reviews.  The film, however, only made $43.1 million on a $40–55 million budget and was a box office bomb.

References

Further reading

External links
 
Annihilation in Goodreads

2014 American novels
2014 science fiction novels
American novels adapted into films
American science fiction novels
Weird fiction novels
English-language novels
Nebula Award for Best Novel-winning works
Science fiction novels adapted into films
Southern Gothic novels 
Works set in lighthouses
Farrar, Straus and Giroux books